The 1903 All-Ireland Senior Football Championship was the 17th staging of Ireland's premier Gaelic football knock-out competition. In the Leinster Quarter final Kildare ended Dublin's period as All Ireland champions. Kerry won their first football All-Ireland.

Format
The four provincial championships are played as usual. The four champions play in the "Home" championship, with the winners of the Home final going on to face  in the All-Ireland final.

Results

Connacht Senior Football Championship

Leinster Senior Football Championship    

A replay was ordered due to a disputed disallowed Kilkenny point.

Munster Senior Football Championship

Ulster Senior Football Championship

All-Ireland Senior Football Championship

Unfinished game - replay ordered.

Championship statistics

Miscellaneous
 Kildare win their first ever Leinster final.
 Kerry win their first ever All Ireland final.

References